Gabon national under-23 football team (also known as Gabon Olympic, Gabon U-23) represents Gabon in international football competitions in the Olympic Games and the CAF U-23 Championship. The selection is limited to players under the age of 23 but the Olympics allows for the addition of up to three overage players. The team is controlled by the Gabonese Football Federation. Gabon made its first appearance in football at the 2012 Olympics in London.

Competitive Record

CAF U-23 Championship

Olympic Games

*Denotes draws including knockout matches decided on penalty kicks.
Forthcoming fixtures

Current squad
The following players were called up in October 2022.

See also
 Gabon national football team

External links
 Official website

References

under-23
African national under-23 association football teams